Local elections were held in Malaya in 1961. They were dominated by the Alliance Party, which won 429 of the 578 seats available, 154 of which were uncontested.

Results

Local elections were held in the Federation of Malaya in 1960.

City council election

George Town

Municipal election

Kuala Lumpur

Malacca

Town councils election

Alor Star

Bandar Maharani, Muar

Bandar Penggaram, Batu Pahat

Bukit Mertajam

Butterworth

Ipoh-Menglembu

Johore Bahru

Kampar

Klang

Kluang

Kota Bharu

Kuala Kangsar

Kuala Pilah

Kuala Trengganu

Kuantan

Pasir Mas

Pasir Puteh

Raub

Segamat

Seremban

Sungei Patani

Taiping

Tanjong Malim

Tapah

Teluk Anson

Temerloh-Mentekab

Tumpat

References

1961
1961 elections in Asia
1961 elections in Malaya